Lycoperdon nigrescens, with the synonym Lycoperdon foetidum, commonly known as the dusky puffball, is a type of puffball mushroom in the genus Lycoperdon. It was first described scientifically in 1794 by the Swedish naturalist Göran Wahlenberg. Visually similar to other species when young, it grows increasingly darker with age, and lacks the pronounced stipe that old Lycoperdon perlatum attain.

It appears from summer to fall in both conifer and hardwood forests, in addition to alpine areas. The caps are shaped somewhat like pears, with spines ranging in brightness, which later break off. The surface is dark between the spines. The stipe has thin strands coming from its base.

References

External links

Fungi described in 1794
Fungi of Europe
Puffballs
nigrescens